Moria was a short-lived one-man political party in Israel between 1990 and 1992.

Background
The party was established on 25 December 1990 during the 12th Knesset, when Minister of Immigrant Absorption and former Shas leader Yitzhak Peretz broke away from Shas to form his own Knesset faction. The faction remained part of Yitzhak Shamir's government, and Peretz retained his ministerial portfolio.

The party ceased to exist when the 12th Knesset was dissolved in 1992. Peretz ran on the United Torah Judaism list for the 1992 elections and retained his seat. However, he resigned from the Knesset three days after being re-elected.

External links
Moriah Knesset website

Political parties established in 1990
Political parties disestablished in 1992
Defunct political parties in Israel
1990 establishments in Israel
1992 disestablishments in Israel
Orthodox Jewish political parties